Wetenhall is a surname. Notable people with the surname include:

Edward Wetenhall (1636-1713), English bishop
John Wetenhall (1669-1717), archdeacon of Cork
Robert C. Wetenhall (1935-2021), American businessman

See also
Wettenhall, village in Cheshire